Anyone Else may refer to:
 "Anyone Else" (Collin Raye song), 1999
 "Anyone Else" (Matt Cardle song), 2012